Divorce in the Family is a 1932 American pre-Code drama film directed by Charles Reisner and written by Delmer Daves. The film stars Jackie Cooper, Conrad Nagel, Lewis Stone, Lois Wilson and Jean Parker. It was released on August 27, 1932, by Metro-Goldwyn-Mayer.

Plot

Cast
 Jackie Cooper as Terry Parker
 Conrad Nagel as Dr. Shumaker
 Lewis Stone as John Parker
 Lois Wilson as Mrs. Shumaker
 Jean Parker as Lucile
 Maurice Murphy as Al Parker
 Lawrence Grant as Kenny
 Richard Wallace as Snoop
 David Newell as Interne
 Oscar Rudolph as Spike
 Louise Beavers as Rosetta
 Edith Fellows as a little girl with a kite (uncredited)

References

External links 
 
 
 
 

1932 films
1932 drama films
American drama films
American black-and-white films
Films directed by Charles Reisner
Films produced by Harry Rapf
Metro-Goldwyn-Mayer films
1930s English-language films
1930s American films
Films with screenplays by Maurice Rapf